Smokers' Paradise is an extended play by Breaking Circus. It was released in 1987 on Homestead Records.  It is the first and only Breaking Circus release to feature second guitarist Phil Harder.  It was intended as a full-length album with four songwriting contributions each from Björklund, Flour, and Trainer.  When Homestead Records insisted that it be a six-song EP (possibly due to budget restrictions), Flour and Trainer's contributions were limited to one song each, while all of Björklund's songs appeared on the record.

Critical reception
Trouser Press called the EP "an eerie and innovative pleasure."

Track listing
"Smokers' Paradise"
"Three Cool Cats"
"ShockHammer Thirteen"
"Emperor Calvin"
"Medicine Lake"
"Eat Lead"

Personnel
Steve Björklund - vocals, guitar
Phil Harder - guitar
Flour - bass, vocals
Todd Trainer - drums, vocals
Iain Burgess - producer

References

Breaking Circus albums
1985 albums
Homestead Records albums